The Porvoo Communion is a communion of 15 predominantly northern European Anglican and Evangelical Lutheran churches, with a couple of far-southwestern European (in the Iberian Peninsula) church bodies of the same denomination. It was established in 1992 by a theological agreement entitled the Porvoo Common Statement which establishes full communion between and among these churches. The agreement was negotiated in the town of Järvenpää in Finland, but the communion's name comes from the nearby city of Porvoo, where a joint Eucharist (or Holy Communion) was celebrated in Porvoo Cathedral after the formal signing in Järvenpää.

Overview
The first seeds to the broader communion formed in 1992 were planted in 1922 when the Anglican Church and the Church of Sweden agreed to enter communion with each other. In 1938, the Archbishop of Canterbury, symbolic head of the Anglican Communion in London, invited the representatives of the Estonian Evangelical Lutheran Church and Latvian Lutheran Church to the Lambeth Palace in London in order to reach "altar and pulpit fellowship" between the Anglican and Baltic Lutheran churches. This process came to a formal conclusion with the establishment of the much wider Porvoo Communion in 1992. The churches involved are the several Anglican churches of the British Isles (headed by the founding Church of England) and the other Evangelical Lutheran churches of the Northern European countries. Later negotiations brought the small Anglican churches of the Iberian Peninsula (Spain and Portugal) into the agreement. These churches all share episcopal polity of church organization with the three-fold ministry of bishops, priests (or pastors) and deacons within the historical episcopate with apostolic succession (only bishops ordaining clergy or other bishops, priests and deacons). This is based on the original ministry of the early church.

The Porvoo Communion has no central office or overseer. Each member church has a contact person and these form a contact group which meets each year. Two bishops, one Lutheran and the other Anglican, are co-moderators of the contact group, and there are two co-secretaries also drawn from each tradition. Both are members of the Lutheran World Federation and the Anglican Communion. There are also various conferences and meetings organized to discuss issues of concern to the entire Communion.

Participants
Signatories of the Porvoo Communion:
1994
 The Estonian Evangelical Lutheran Church
The Evangelical Lutheran Church in Lithuania
 The Church of Norway
The Scottish Episcopal Church
 The Church of Sweden
1995
 The Church of England
 The Evangelical Lutheran Church of Finland
The Church of Ireland
The Church of Iceland
  The Church in Wales
2001
The Lusitanian Catholic Apostolic Evangelical Church (Portugal)
 The Spanish Reformed Episcopal Church
2010
The Church of Denmark – The Church of Denmark voted in December 2009 to join the Porvoo Communion as a full member and signed the "Porvoo Common Statement" declaration on October 3, 2010.
2014
The Latvian Evangelical Lutheran Church Worldwide
 The Lutheran Church in Great Britain

Observers
 The Evangelical Lutheran Church of Latvia, since 1994

See also

 Churches Beyond Borders
 Called to Common Mission
 Convocation of Episcopal Churches in Europe
 Waterloo Declaration
 Communion of Protestant Churches in Europe
 Ecumenical Movement
 List of the largest Protestant denominations

References

Further reading

External links

Protestant ecumenism
Porvoo
History of Lutheranism
Anglican ecumenism
Church of England
Church of Ireland
Church in Wales
Scottish Episcopal Church
Evangelical Lutheran Church of Finland
Church of Norway
Church of Sweden
Protestantism in Europe
Christian ecumenical organizations
1992 establishments in Europe
Christian organizations established in 1992
1992 in Christianity
1992 in Finland